The Idolmaster Cinderella Girls is a 2015 anime series based on the simulation social network game of the same name as part of Bandai Namco Entertainment The Idolmaster franchise. The series follows a group of rookie idols as they are recruited by 346 Production's Cinderella Project and aspire to become top idols. The anime is produced by A-1 Pictures and directed by Noriko Takao. Takao and writer Tatsuya Takahashi share supervision duty for the series screenplay, and Yūsuke Matsuo based the character designs on designs provided by illustrator Annin Dōfu; the music was composed by Hidekazu Tanaka of Monaca. The series aired in two separate seasons, alternating between reruns of the first The Idolmaster anime series. The first half aired on BS11 via satellite, and Tokyo MX and nine other local independent terrestrial stations between January 10 and April 11, 2015 and was simulcast by Daisuki. The second half aired from July 17 to October 17, 2015.

The opening theme for the first season is "Star!!" by Cinderella Project (Ayaka Ōhashi, Ayaka Fukuhara, Sayuri Hara, Tomoyo Kurosawa, Sumire Uesaka, Naomi Ōzora, Maaya Uchida, Nozomi Yamamoto, Ruriko Aoki, Aya Suzaki, Hiromi Igarashi, Natsumi Takamori, Yuka Ōtsubo, and Rei Matsuzaki). The second season's opening theme is "Shine!!" by Cinderella Project.

An anime adaptation of Kuma-Jet's Cinderella Girls Theater spin-off manga, produced by Gathering and directed by Mankyū, was announced on November 28, 2016, as part of the game's 5th anniversary via a 3-minute short film distributed online and premiered its first season which ran from April 4 to June 27, 2017. The series has since been renewed for three more seasons, with the second season premiering on October 3, 2017, the third running from July 3 to September 25, 2018 and the fourth, titled Climax Season, from April 2 to June 25, 2019.

Cinderella Girls episode list

Theater episode list

TV series

Web series

Blu-ray specials

Notes

References

External links
 The Idolmaster Cinderella Girls official website 
 The Idolmaster Cinderella Girls Theater official website 
 
 
 

Lists of anime episodes
Cinderella Girls